The Bionectriaceae are a family of fungi in the order Hypocreales. A 2008 estimate places 35 genera and 281 species in the family. Species in the family tend to grow on plant material, including woody debris, while some species associate with algae, bryophytes, or other fungi.

Genera
This is a list of the genera in the Bionectriaceae, based on a 2022 review and summary of fungal classification by Wijayawardene and colleagues. Following the genus name is the taxonomic authority (those who first circumscribed the genus; standardized author abbreviations are used), year of publication, and the number of species:
Acremonium  – ca. 150
Anthonectria  – 1 sp.
Aphanotria  – 1 sp.
Battarrina  – 1 sp.
Bryocentria  – 15 spp.
Bryotria  – 2 spp.
Bullanockia  – 1 sp.
Chrysonectria  – 1 sp.
Clibanites  – 1 sp.
Clonostachys  – 78 spp.
Dimerosporiella  – 8 spp.
Fusariella  – 17 spp.
Geonectria  – 1 sp.
Geosmithia  – 24 spp.
Gliomastix  – 24 spp.
Globonectria  – 1 sp.
Gracilistilbella  – 4 spp.
Halonectria  – 1 sp.
Heleococcum  – 5 spp.
Hydropisphaera  – 29 spp.
Ijuhya  – 22 spp.
Kallichroma  – 4 spp.
Lasionectria  – 23 spp.
Mycoarachis  – 2 spp.
Mycocitrus  – 3 spp.
Nectriella  – 84 spp.
Nectriopsis  – 70 spp.
Ochronectria  – 3 spp.
Ovicuculispora  – 2 spp.
Paranectria  – 4 spp.
Periantria  – 2 spp.
Peristomialis  – 6 spp.
Pronectria  – 44 spp.
Protocreopsis  – 12 spp.
Roumegueriella  – 4 spp.
Selinia  – 6 spp.
Stephanonectria  – 1 sp.
Stilbocrea  – 7 spp.
Stromatonectria  – 1 sp.
Synnemellisia  – 2 spp.
Trichonectria  – 19 spp.
Verrucostoma  – 2 spp.
Xanthonectria  – 1 sp.

References

 
Ascomycota families
Taxa described in 1999